Ain't It the Truth is the third studio album by American country music singer Daryle Singletary. It was released in 1998 via Giant Records. It was led off by the single "The Note" (previously recorded by Doug Supernaw on 1995's You Still Got Me), which peaked at #28 on the country singles charts that year. The next two singles, "That's Where You're Wrong" and "My Baby's Lovin'" both missed Top 40, and by the end of the year, Singletary exited the label's roster. "A Thing Called Love" was originally released by Jimmy Dean. "The Note" was also Singletary's only entry on the Billboard Hot 100 chart, peaking at #90.

Track listing

Personnel
 Larry Byrom - acoustic guitar, electric guitar
 Joe Chemay - bass guitar
 Larry Franklin - fiddle
 Paul Franklin - dobro, steel guitar
 Sonny Garrish - steel guitar
 Steve Gibson - acoustic guitar, electric guitar, mandolin
 John Hobbs - keyboards, synthesizer
 Dann Huff - bass guitar, electric guitar
 Paul Leim - drums, percussion
 Liana Manis - background vocals
 Brent Rowan - electric guitar
 John Wesley Ryles - background vocals
 Daryle Singletary - lead vocals
 Kerry Singletary - background vocals
 Biff Watson - acoustic guitar
 Dennis Wilson - background vocals
 Lonnie Wilson - drums
 Glenn Worf - bass guitar

Chart performance

References

1998 albums
Daryle Singletary albums
Giant Records (Warner) albums
Albums produced by Doug Johnson (record producer)